The chairman of the Council of Ministers of Bosnia and Herzegovina (Bosnian/Croatian: Predsjedavajući Vijeća ministara Bosne i Hercegovine) is the head of the government of Bosnia and Herzegovina.

The chairman of the Council of Ministers is nominated by the Presidency of Bosnia and Herzegovina, and appointed by the House of Representatives of Bosnia and Herzegovina. As head of the government, the chairman of the Council of Ministers has no authority for appointing ministers, and his role is that of a coordinator. Ministers are appointed in his or her stead by the majority-parties according to ethnic and entity representation rules, so that a deputy minister must not be of same ethnicity as the respective minister.

Borjana Krišto is the 11th and current chairwoman of the Council of Ministers. She took office on 25 January 2023, following the 2022 general election. Krišto is the first female occupant of the office.

List of chairpersons

Before independence (1945–1992)

Since independence (1992–present)

Prime Minister of the Republic of Bosnia and Herzegovina (1992–1997)

Co-Chairmen of the Council of Ministers of Bosnia and Herzegovina (1997–2000)

Chairman of the Council of Ministers of Bosnia and Herzegovina (2000–present)

Timeline

See also
Council of Ministers of Bosnia and Herzegovina
Presidency of Bosnia and Herzegovina
List of members of the Presidency of Bosnia and Herzegovina
List of members of the Presidency of Bosnia and Herzegovina by time in office
Chairman of the Presidency of Bosnia and Herzegovina

References

 
Bosnia and Herzegovina politics-related lists
Bosnia and Herzegovina